Dominique-Napoléon Saint-Cyr (August 4, 1826 – March 3, 1899) was a politician in Quebec, Canada and a two-term Member of the Legislative Assembly of Quebec (MLA).

Early life

He was born on August 4, 1826, in Nicolet, Centre-du-Québec and was an educator.

Political career

He ran as a Conservative candidate in the district of in the provincial district of Champlain in 1875 and won.  He succeeded François-Xavier-Anselme Trudel.

Saint-Cyr was re-elected in 1878, but did not run for re-election in 1881.  He was succeeded by Conservative Robert Trudel.

Death

He died on March 3, 1899, in Quebec City.

Footnotes

See also
Champlain Provincial Electoral District
Mauricie

1826 births
1899 deaths
Conservative Party of Quebec MNAs